Richard Hanley Jaeckel (October 10, 1926 – June 14, 1997) was an American actor of film and television. Jaeckel became a well-known character actor in his career, which spanned six decades. He received a Best Supporting Actor Oscar nomination for his role in the 1971 adaptation of Ken Kesey's Sometimes a Great Notion.

Early years
Jaeckel was born October 10, 1926, in Long Beach, New York, the son of Richard Jaeckel and Millicent Hanley. His father was active in the family's fur business, and his mother was a stage actress. His birth name was R. Hanley Jaeckel, with only the initial rather than a first name. He attended The Harvey School and other private schools. The family lived in New York until 1934, when they moved to Los Angeles, where his father operated a branch of the family business. He graduated from Hollywood High School.

Career
A short, tough man, Jaeckel played a variety of characters during his 50 years in films and television. Jaeckel got his start in the business at the age of seventeen while he was employed as a mailboy at 20th Century Fox studios in Hollywood. A casting director auditioned him for a role in the 1943 film Guadalcanal Diary; Jaeckel won the role and settled into a lengthy career in supporting parts.

He served in the United States Merchant Marine from 1944 to 1949, then starred in two of the most remembered war films of 1949: Battleground and Sands of Iwo Jima with John Wayne. One of Jaeckel's shortest film roles was in The Gunfighter, in which his character is killed by Gregory Peck's character in the opening scene. He played the role of Turk, the roomer's boyfriend, in the Academy Award-winning 1952 film Come Back, Little Sheba, with Shirley Booth, Burt Lancaster, and Terry Moore. In 1960, he appeared as Angus Pierce in the western, Flaming Star, starring Elvis Presley. He played Lee Marvin's able second-in-command, Sgt. Bowren, in the 1967 film The Dirty Dozen for director Robert Aldrich, and reprised the role in the 1985 sequel, The Dirty Dozen: Next Mission. Jaeckel appeared in several other Aldrich films, including Attack (1956), Ulzana's Raid (1972), and Twilight's Last Gleaming (1977).

Jaeckel also guest-starred in many television programs. He was cast as a boxer in a 1954 episode of Reed Hadley's CBS legal drama, The Public Defender. Also in 1954, Jaeckel portrayed Billy the Kid in an episode of the syndicated western anthology series, Stories of the Century, with Jim Davis as the fictitious Southwest Railroad detective Matt Clark.

Seven years later, Jaeckel played Denver in "The Grudge Fight" episode of the NBC western series The Tall Man.

In 1957, he appeared as Mort Claffey in two episodes, "Paratroop Padre" and "The Light," of the syndicated religion anthology series, Crossroads. That same year, he portrayed Lieutenant Bradshaw in episode "War of the Whale Boats" of the military drama, Navy Log. In 1956 and 1957, he appeared in three episodes of another military drama, The West Point Story.

In 1955 and 1958, Jaeckel appeared in different roles on two episodes of CBS's fantasy drama The Millionaire. In 1958, Jaeckel guest-starred as Webb Martin in the episode "The Bloodline" of NBC's western series Cimarron City. That same year, he appeared in the syndicated drama of the American Civil War, Gray Ghost in the episode entitled "The Hero". In 1959, Jaeckel was cast as Clint Gleason in episode "The Man Behind the Star" of CBS's The Texan western series, starring Rory Calhoun.

In 1960, Jaeckel appeared twice on Nick Adams's ABC western series, The Rebel, as Marshal Roader in "The Rattler" and as Clyde Traskel in "Run, Killer, Run". 
 
In 1963, Jaeckel played Willie the murderer in "The Case of the Lover's Leap" on CBS's Perry Mason, starring Raymond Burr. That same year he was among the guest stars on the short-lived ABC/Warner Brothers western series, The Dakotas and in "The Predators" episode of Have Gun – Will Travel, Season 6 (1962). Also in 1963, Jaeckel, speaking in German, played the role of Wehrmacht Sgt. Buxman in the Combat! TV series episode "Gideon's Army."  Finally in that year, he guest starred in the TV Western Series Gunsmoke in the S8E27 episode "Two of a Kind", playing Irish immigrant mine owner O’Ryan, who was feuding with his partner. Jaeckel appeared in Alfred Hitchcock Presents "Incident in a Small Jail" (1961) as well as The Alfred Hitchcock Hour episodes , "Low Clouds and Coastal Fog" (1963), "Death of a Cop (1963), and "Off Season" (1965).

In 1964, Jaeckel appeared as Danny in the episode "Keep Cool" of The New Phil Silvers Show and as Mitch Devlin in an episode of Bonanza, ″Between Heaven and Earth″. 

In 1966, Jaeckel made a second guest appearance on Perry Mason as Mike Woods in the episode "The Case of the Bogus Buccaneers." That same year he also co-starred as Christopher Cable in an episode – "The Night of the Grand Emir" – of The Wild Wild West. He guest-starred in 1967  as Dibbs in the episode "Night of Reckoning" on Bonanza.

Jaeckel's most famous film appearances of the 1950s are in 3:10 to Yuma (1957) and The Naked and the Dead (1958). His film career achieved its greatest success in the period 1967 to 1975, in such features as The Dirty Dozen (1967), The Devil's Brigade (1968), Chisum (1970), Sometimes a Great Notion (1971) (for which he received an Academy Award nomination for Best Supporting Actor), Ulzana's Raid (1972), Pat Garrett and Billy the Kid (1973), The Outfit (1973), The Drowning Pool (1975), and Walking Tall Part 2 (1975). Chisum was a John Wayne vehicle in which Jaeckel, Christopher George and Andrew Prine all co-starred in prominent supporting roles. The three would re-team six years later in Grizzly (1976) (an amiable "Jaws" ripoff reset in the forest), and Jaeckel and George would team again in another "nature strikes back" story, Day of the Animals (1977).

In 1976 he starred in the B movie Mako: The Jaws of Death.

On television, in 1975 he starred as the title character on the episode “Larkin” on Gunsmoke (S20E17). In 1977, Jaeckel appeared with Donna Mills, Bill Bixby, and William Shatner in the last episode, entitled "The Scarlet Ribbon", of NBC's western series The Oregon Trail, starring Rod Taylor and Andrew Stevens. The following year he played Sergeant Lykes in the epic TV miniseries Centennial.

He had a recurring role in the short-lived Andy Griffith vehicle Salvage 1 (1979).

The later films in his career included a major role in John Carpenter's 1984 film Starman as an NSA agent hunting an alien life form played by Jeff Bridges as well as in the action films Black Moon Rising with Tommy Lee Jones and Delta Force 2: The Colombian Connection with Chuck Norris.  In his later years, Jaeckel was known to television audiences as Lt. Ben Edwards on Baywatch. He also co-starred on Robert Urich's ABC series Spenser: For Hire in the role of Lieutenant Martin Quirk.

Personal life
On May 29, 1947, Jaeckel married Antoinette Helen Marches in Tijuana, Mexico. They had two sons, Barry and Richard. His son Barry is a professional golfer who has won on the PGA Tour.

Death

Jaeckel died at the age of 70 from cancer, at the Motion Picture & Television Hospital in Woodland Hills, California.

Recognition
In 1972, Jaeckel received an Academy Award nomination for Best Supporting Actor for his role in Sometimes a Great Notion. In 1992, he received a Golden Boot Award for his work in westerns.

Selected filmography

 Guadalcanal Diary (1943) as Pvt. Johnny ('Chicken') Anderson
 Wing and a Prayer (1944) as Beezy Bessemer
 Jungle Patrol (1948) as Lt. Dick Carter
 City Across the River (1949) as Bull
 Battleground (1949) as Bettis
 Sands of Iwo Jima (1949) as Pfc. Frank Flynn
 The Gunfighter (1950) as Eddie
 Wyoming Mail (1950) as Nate
 Fighting Coast Guard (1951) as Tony Jessup
 The Sea Hornet (1951) as Johnny Radford
 My Son John (1952) as Chuck Jefferson
 Hoodlum Empire (1952) as Ted Dawson
 Come Back, Little Sheba (1952) as Turk Fisher
 Big Leaguer (1953) as Bobby Bronson
 Sea of Lost Ships (1953) as Ensign H.G. 'Hap' O'Malley
 The Violent Men (1954) as Wade Matlock
 The Shanghai Story (1954) as 'Knuckles' Greer
 Apache Ambush (1955) as Lee Parker
 Attack! (1956) as Pvt. Snowden
 3:10 to Yuma (1957) as Charlie Prince
 Cowboy (1958) as Paul Curtis
 The Lineup (1958) as Sandy McLain
 The Naked and the Dead (1958) as Gallagher
 The Gun Runners (1958) as Buzurki
 When Hell Broke Loose (1958) as Karl
 Platinum High School (1960) as Hack Marlow
 The Gallant Hours (1960) as Lt. Cmdr. Roy Webb
 Flaming Star (1960) as Angus Pierce
 Town Without Pity (1961) as Cpl. Birdwell "Birdie" Scott
 The Predators (1962) as John Tyree (Have Gun – Will Travel)
 The Young and The Brave (1963) as Cpl. John Estway
 4 for Texas (1963) as Pete Mancini
 Nightmare in the Sun (1965) as Motorcyclist
 Town Tamer (1965) as Deputy Johnny Honsinger
 Once Before I Die (1966) as Lt. Custer
 The Dirty Dozen (1967) as Sgt. Clyde Bowren
 The Devil's Brigade (1968) as Pvt. Omar Greco
 The Green Slime (1968) as Commander Vince Elliott
 Latitude Zero (1969) as Perry Lawton
 Surabaya Conspiracy (1970) as Dirk
 Chisum (1970) as Jesse Evans
 Sometimes a Great Notion (1971) as Joe Ben Stamper
 The Deadly Dream (1971) (TV) as Delgreve
 Mission Impossible (1971) (TV) as Edward Trask
 Ulzana's Raid (1972) as Sergeant
 Pat Garrett and Billy the Kid (1973) as Sheriff Kip McKinney
 The Outfit (1973) as Kimmie Cherney
 Chosen Survivors (1974) as Major Gordon Ellis
 The Drowning Pool (1975) as Franks
 Walking Tall Part 2 (1975) as Stud Pardee
 The Kill (1975) as Ming
 Grizzly (1976) as Arthur Scott
 Mako: The Jaws of Death (1976) as Sonny Stein
 Twilight's Last Gleaming (1977) as Capt. Stanford Towne
 Day of the Animals (1977) as Professor MacGregor
 Speedtrap (1977) as Billy
 Mr. No Legs (1979) as Chuck
 The Dark (1979) as Det. Dave Mooney
 Salvage 1 (1979) as Jack Klinger
 Pacific Inferno (1979) as Dealer
 Delta Fox (1979) as Santana
 Herbie Goes Bananas (1980) as Shepard
 ...All the Marbles (1981) as Bill Dudley 
 Cold River (1982) as Mike Allison
 Blood Song (1982) as Frank Hauser
 Airplane II: The Sequel (1982) as Controller #2
 Goma-2 (1984) as Martin
 Starman (1984) as George Fox
 The Dirty Dozen: Next Mission (1985) as Sgt. Clyde Bowren
 The Fix (1985) as Charles Dale
 Black Moon Rising (1986) as Earl Windom
 Ghetto Blaster (1989) as Mike Henry
 Delta Force 2: The Colombian Connection (1990) as DEA Agent John Page
 The King of the Kickboxers (1991) as Captain O'Day
 Martial Outlaw (1993) as Mr. White

References

External links

 

1926 births
1997 deaths
20th-century American male actors
American male film actors
American male television actors
American military personnel of World War II
American sailors
Deaths from cancer in California
Male actors from Los Angeles
Male actors from New York (state)
Male Western (genre) film actors
Military personnel from New York (state)
People from Long Beach, New York
United States Merchant Mariners
United States Merchant Mariners of World War II